The Manitoba Aviation Council (MAC) is an association whose mandate states: to promote, facilitate, and protect the development of all facets of aviation in Manitoba, Canada.

Role
MAC also works with the Northern Air Transport Association and the Northwest Ontario airports and air carrier groups, as well as cooperating with the national aviation associations. Like the aviation industries in British Columbia, Alberta and Saskatchewan, all the western Canada provinces have active councils that have provided many benefits to their aviation communities.

While respecting the particular interests of other aviation-related organizations in Manitoba, the Council strives to serve as an "umbrella group" to represent all groups, as well as interested individuals and businesses in specific aviation matters.

History
The Manitoba Aviation Council, active in the 1960s and 1970s, was reactivated in 1995 by Barry MacIntosh and Stephen Blight, assisted by a score of dedicated volunteers. Barry and Stephen's contribution was recognized by the International Northwest Aviation Council with an award presented at MAC's March 5, 2002 AGM.

Present day
Today, MAC's membership database numbers more than 250. MAC keeps its members informed about aviation issues from local to global concerns through a monthly electronic newsletter, the Western Canada Aviation & Aerospace trade journal and other means.

See also
Canadian Airports Council
Canadian Owners and Pilots Association

References

Aviation in Manitoba
Aviation organizations based in Canada
Organizations based in Winnipeg